"Kimi Attraction" is a single by Hey! Say! JUMP. It was released on October 21, 2015.
 
The title song was chosen as the CM song for Kose Cosme Port's Softymo. It is described as a pop tune with a sense of speed about an intense love.
 
The single was released in three different versions: Regular Edition, Limited Edition 1, and Limited Edition 2. The limited editions contained a DVD including a PV and making footage.

Regular Edition
CD
 "Kimi Attraction"
 "Shall We?"
 "NEW AGE"
 "Ignition"
 "Kimi Attraction"（Original Karaoke）
 "Shall We?"（Original Karaoke）
 "NEW AGE"（Original Karaoke）
 "Ignition"（Original Karaoke）

Limited Edition 1
CD
 "Kimi Attraction"
 "ChikuTaku"
 
DVD
 "Kimi Attraction" (PV & Making of)

Limited Edition 2
CD
 "Kimi Attraction"
 "Aki、Hare。Boku ni Kaze ga Fuita。"
 
DVD
 "Kimi Attraction" (PV & Making of) Dance Version

References

 

 

2015 singles
Hey! Say! JUMP songs
2015 songs
J Storm singles